Entença may refer to:
Entença (town), village in the pre-Pyrenees
House of Entença, ancient dynasty of the Crown of Aragon and Catalonia
Berenguer de Entença, commander of the Catalan Company 
Carrer d'Entença, Barcelona, street in Barcelona 
Entença (Barcelona Metro), a station on line 5 of the Barcelona Metro

See also
Entenza (disambiguation)